Aspidosperma parvifolium is a timber tree native to Brazil, which is typical of Atlantic Forest, Cerrado, Caatinga, and Pantanal vegetation. This plant is cited in Flora Brasiliensis by Carl Friedrich Philipp von Martius. In addition, it is useful for beekeeping.

References

External links
 Flora Brasiliensis: Aspidosperma parvifolium 
 Aspidosperma parvifolium

parvifolium
Endemic flora of Brazil
Flora of the Cerrado
Flora of the Atlantic Forest
Trees of Brazil
Plants described in 1844